William Allan Armour (30 April 1880–21 April 1967) was a New Zealand school principal and educationalist. He was born in Dunedin, New Zealand on 30 April 1880.

References

1880 births
1967 deaths
Schoolteachers from Dunedin